The 2019 Nigerian Senate election in Niger State held on February 23, 2019, to elect members of the Nigerian Senate to represent Niger State. Sani Mohammed Musa  representing Niger East, Aliyu Sabi Abdullahi representing Niger North and  Bima Muhammad Enagi  representing Niger South all won on the platform of the platform of All Progressives Congress.

Overview

Summary

Results

Niger East 
A total of 13 candidates registered with the Independent National Electoral Commission to contest in the election. APC candidate Sani Mohammed Musa won the election, defeating PDP candidate Ibrahim Isiyaku and 11 other party candidates. Sani Mohammed Musa received 65.14% of the votes, while Ibrahim Isiyaku received 32.98%.

Niger North 
A total of 15 candidates registered with the Independent National Electoral Commission to contest in the election. APC candidate Aliyu Sabi Abdullahi won the election, defeating PDP candidate Muhammad Sani Duba and 13 other party candidates. Aliyu Sabi Abdullahi received 65.16% of the votes, while Muhammad Duba received 31.13%

Niger South 
A total of 12 candidates registered with the Independent National Electoral Commission to contest in the election. APC candidate Bima Muhammad Enagi won the election, defeating PDP candidate Baba Shehu Agaie and 10 other party candidates. Bima Muhammad Enagi received 61.63% of the votes, while Baba Shehu Agaie received 34.91%

References 

Niger State senatorial elections